Hanlong Group (汉龙集团) is a Chinese conglomerate with holdings in solar energy, communications, chemicals, mineral exploration, and other industries.

Sichuan Hongda (四川宏達) is a mining company and subsidiary of Hanlong listed on the Shanghai Stock Exchange.   

In 2011, Hongda announced a $3 billion investment in coal and iron mining Tanzania, making it the biggest investor in East Africa.  Under the deal, a sub-project is to build a major coal plant and supply chain to provide an ample supply of electricity in Tanzania, removing the one of the biggest roadblocks to manufacturing foreign investment.  To build Tanzanian power infrastructure, Hongda formed a joint venture with the government of Tanzania named Tanzania China International Mineral Resources (TCIMR).  The project plan calls for the building of the Mchuchuma and Katewaka coal to electricity facility, which is expected to be the top capacity plant in the country, producing 600MW at full capacity.  The facility is expected to start producing 300MW by 2015.

Between 2011 and 2013 Hanlong conducted a takeover attempt for Sundance Resources of Australia. However, the deal fell through when Hanlong was unable to meet its funding obligations.

Corruption and execution
In 2014, former head of Hanlong Liu Han, along with his brother Liu Wei and dozens of other associates, was charged with nine murders and accused of running a mafia-style operation since 1993. According to state media, Liu's gang also ran a gambling ring in their home town of Guanghan and operated under the protection of local official Zhou Yongkang. Liu was later sentenced to death and was executed on 9 February 2015.

In February 15, 2013, Calvin Zhu, vice president of one of Hanlong's local branches, was sentenced to 15 months in jail for insider trading.

References

External links
Hanlong Group homepage

Companies based in Sichuan
Organized crime in China
Coal companies of China